Peter Henry Christopher Badham (11 February 1911 – 10 April 1983) was an English cricketer.  Badham was a right-handed batsman who bowled right-arm medium pace.  He was born in Bagworth, Leicestershire and educated at Winchester College, where he played for the college cricket team.

Badham made his first-class debut for Leicestershire against Oxford University in 1933, which was his only first-class appearance for his home county.  The following year he played 3 further first-class matches for Oxford University, the last coming against a combined Minor Counties team.  In his 4 career first-class matches, he scored 67 runs at a batting average of 11.16, with a high score of 38.

The same season he played for Leicestershire also saw him make his Minor Counties Championship debut for Buckinghamshire, a team he played Minor counties cricket for through to the end of the 1934 season.  He later joined Dorset, making his debut for the county in the 1937 Minor Counties Championship against Oxfordshire.  He played for Dorset up to 1939, playing for them in 1946 and 1947 following the end of the Second World War.

He died in Upton, Dorset on 10 April 1983.

References

External links
Peter Badham at ESPNcricinfo
Peter Badham at CricketArchive

1911 births
1983 deaths
Cricketers from Leicestershire
People educated at Winchester College
English cricketers
Leicestershire cricketers
Buckinghamshire cricketers
Oxford University cricketers
Dorset cricketers
Alumni of Oriel College, Oxford